Vajrai is known as a devotional place. Also this place is known as Vajrai Waterfall. According to people of there, Marathi Saint Samarth Ramdas Swami has climbed this mountain in 3 footsteps because of that straight Vajrai Waterfall mountain is converted into three stair waterfall mountain.

Vajrai Waterfall is situated at the Sahyadri hills near Satara. As per geographical view,  Vajrai Waterfall's height is around 853 ft. The backwaters of Vajrai Waterfall are known as Urmodi river Project. Vajrai Waterfall can be reached through Kaas Road .

References

Satara district